Stigmella armeniana is a moth of the family Nepticulidae. It is found in Armenia.

The larvae feed on Rhamnus sintenisii. They probably mine the leaves of their host.

External links
Revised Check-List Of Mining Lepidoptera (Nepticuloidea, Tischerioidea And Gracillarioidea) From Central Asia

Nepticulidae
Moths of Asia
Moths described in 1994